Derinöz is a village in the Oğuzlar District of Çorum Province in Turkey. Its population is 349 (2022).

References

Villages in Oğuzlar District